Roller Coaster Rumbler is a rail shooter-type video game. It was designed by Subway Software (Arnie Katz, Bill Kunkel and Joyce Worley) for British publisher Tynesoft, which published it in 1989. Versions appeared on the PC, Amiga, Atari ST and Commodore 64 with quality varying greatly among the SKUs.

In this first-person game, the player sits in the front seat of a roller coaster armed with a mounted machine gun and fires at pop-up targets which are released during the course of the ride.

External links

1989 video games
DOS games
Amiga games
Atari ST games
Commodore 64 games
Rail shooters
Roller coaster games and simulations
Video games developed in the United Kingdom
Tynesoft games